Sijarina is a village in the municipality of Medveđa, Serbia. According to the 2002 census, the village has a population of 359 people. Of these, 272 (75,76 %) were ethnic Albanians, 73 (20,33 %) were Serbs, 9 (2,50 %) Romani, 3 (0,83 %) Montenegrins, and 2 (0,55 %) others.

References

Populated places in Jablanica District
Albanian communities in Serbia